Events in 1936 in animation.

Films released

Events

January
 January 4: David Hand's Mickey's Polo Team premieres, produced by the Walt Disney Animation Studios. It stars Mickey Mouse, Donald Duck, Goofy, various other Disney characters, and caricatures of Hollywood celebrities like Charlie Chaplin, Laurel & Hardy and Harpo Marx.
 January 17: Somewhere in Dreamland, directed and produced by the Fleischer Brothers, is their first cartoon in three-strip Technicolor.
 January 31: The animated short Betty Boop and the Little King, directed and produced by the Fleischer Brothers, premieres, being a crossover between Betty Boop and Otto Soglow's newspaper comic The Little King.

March
 March 5: 8th Academy Awards: Three Orphan Kittens, directed by David Hand and produced by Walt Disney Animation Studios, wins the Academy Award for Best Animated Short Film.
 March 7: 
 Hugh Harman's The Old Mill Pond premieres, produced by MGM. It features caricatures of various famous jazz musicians like Cab Calloway, Louis Armstrong and Fats Waller.
 Tex Avery's Page Miss Glory, produced by Warner Bros. Cartoons, premieres.
 March 27: Betty Boop and Little Jimmy, directed and produced by the Fleischer Brothers, premieres, being a crossover between Betty Boop and Jimmy Swinnerton's series Little Jimmy.
 March 28: Wilfred Jackson's Elmer Elephant, produced by Walt Disney Animation Studios, premieres.

April
 April 4: Tex Avery's The Blow Out, produced by Warner Bros. Cartoons, premieres. It marks the first cartoon in which side character Porky Pig has a starring role.

May
 May 2: Friz Freleng's Let It Be Me premieres, produced by Warner Bros. Cartoons. The cartoon features a caricature of popular singer Bing Crosby; however, the real Crosby found this portrayal of him offensive and tried to stop distribution of the short.
 May 30: 
 Friz Freleng's Bingo Crosbyana premieres, produced by Warner Bros. Cartoons. Like Let It Be Me, it features a caricature of Bing Crosby, which the real Crosby found offensive, resulting in him trying to stop distribution of the short.
 David Hand's Mickey Mouse cartoon Thru the Mirror is first released, produced by Walt Disney Animation Studios. In this cartoon, Mickey dreams that he travels through his mirror and in a memorable scene, dances with a pack of playing cards.

June
 June 20: 
 Wilfred Jackson's Mickey Mouse cartoon Mickey's Rival premieres, produced by Walt Disney Animation Studios. Mickey Mouse is pitted against Mortimer Mouse, who tries to fancy his girlfriend Minnie Mouse.
 Ben Sharpsteen's Moving Day is released, produced by the Walt Disney Animation Studios, starring Mickey Mouse, Donald Duck and Goofy. In the cartoon the characters move out all their furniture, with a memorable scene in which Goofy fights a living piano.

July
 July 18: Tex Avery's I Love to Singa premieres, produced by Warner Bros. Cartoons.
 Specific date unknown: Carl Stalling is hired as composer for Warner Bros. Cartoons.

August
 August 8: Friz Freleng's Sunday Go to Meetin' Time premieres, produced by Warner Bros. Cartoons.
 August 10–31: 4th Venice International Film Festival: 
 David Hand's Who Killed Cock Robin, produced by the Walt Disney Animation Studios, wins the award for Best Animation.
 Len Lye's experimental animated film A Colour Box is shown, but causes a riot among Nazi supporters who label it degenerate art and protest the film. They stomp their feet loudly, leading to the three-minute film being stopped before its completion.
 August 22: Frank Tashlin's Porky's Poultry Plant premieres, starring Porky Pig and produced by Warner Bros. Cartoons.

October
 October 10: Friz Freleng's Boulevardier from the Bronx premieres, produced by Warner Bros. Cartoons. It is the first Warner Bros. Cartoon to use Merrily We Roll Along as its theme song.
 October 31: Wilfred Jackson's The Country Cousin, produced by Walt Disney Animation, is first released.

November
 November 27: Popeye the Sailor Meets Sindbad the Sailor, produced and directed by The Fleischer Brothers, is first released. It is the first Popeye the Sailor cartoon over 16 minutes long and in color.
 November 28: Friz Freleng's The Coo-Coo Nut Grove is first released, produced by Warner Bros. Cartoons. The cartoon features various caricatures of Hollywood celebrities.

Specific date unknown
 Carlo Campogalliani's The Four Musketeers is first released.
 Len Lye's Rainbow Dance is released, a combination of live-action and animation.
 Mikhail Tsekhanovsky and Vera Tsekhanovskaya's The Tale of the Priest and of His Workman Balda is abandoned halfway through production and never finished.
 Raoul Verdini and Umberto Spano's The Adventures of Pinocchio is an animated film which is never completed, because of technical problems.

Births

January
 January 2: Roger Miller, American singer and actor (voice of Alan-a-Dale in Robin Hood), (d. 1992).
 January 6: Corinne Orr, Canadian actress (voice of Trixie in Speed Racer).
 January 23: Arlene Golonka, American actress (voice of Debbie in Speed Buggy), (d. 2021).

February
 February 11: Burt Reynolds, American actor (voice of Charlie B. Barkin in All Dogs Go to Heaven, Senator Buckingham in American Dad!, Judge Keaton in the Duckman episode "Das Sub", M.F. Thatherton in the King of the Hill episode "The Company Man"), (d. 2018).
 February 29: Alex Rocco, American actor (voice of Roger Meyers, Jr. in The Simpsons, Thorny in A Bug's Life, Larry in Pepper Ann, Bea Arthur and Soccer Mom in Family Guy, Carmine Falcone in Batman: Year One, Mr. Malone in the Bonkers episode "Frame That Toon", Lucky Rabbit in The Angry Beavers episode "Big Fun", Old Caddie in The Life & Times of Tim episode "The Caddy's Shack", additional voices in Lloyd in Space), (d. 2015).

March
 March 5: Dean Stockwell, American actor (voice of Duke Nukem in Captain Planet and the Planeteers, adult Tim Drake in Batman Beyond: Return of the Joker), (d. 2021).
 March 9: Marty Ingels, American actor and comedian (voice of the title character in Pac-Man, Hathi in The Jungle Book: Mowgli's Story, Beegle Beagle in The Great Grape Ape Show, Autocat in Cattanooga Cats), (d. 2015).
 March 15: Paul Fierlinger, Czech-American animator (Sesame Street, My Dog Tulip).
 March 16: Elisabeth Volkmann, German actress and comedian (dub voice of Marge Simpson and Patty and Selma in The Simpsons), (d. 2006).
 March 17: Patty Maloney, American actress (voice of Tanis in Scooby-Doo and the Ghoul School, Darla in The Little Rascals, Mrs. Segar in The New Batman Adventures episode "Double Talk").
 Specific date unknown: Hu Jinqing, Chinese animator and director (The Fight Between the Snipe and the Clam, Calabash Brothers), (d. 2019).

April
April 10: John Madden, American football player, coach and sports commentator (voiced himself in The Simpsons episode "Sunday, Cruddy Sunday"), (d. 2021).
 April 12: Charles Napier, American actor (voice of Duke Phillips in The Critic, General Hardcastle in Superman: The Animated Series and Justice League Unlimited, Cooley in Buzz Lightyear of Star Command, original voice of the Sheriff in Squidbillies), (d. 2011).
 April 20: Lisa Davis, English-American former actress (voice of Anita Ratcliffe in One Hundred and One Dalmatians).
 April 22: Glen Campbell, American guitarist, singer, songwriter, actor and television host (voice of Chanticleer in Rock-a-Doodle), (d. 2017).
 April 21: Avo Paistik, Estonian animated film director, animator and illustrator (Lend, Tolmuimeja, Klaabu, Nipi ja tige kala, Klaabu kosmoses, Naksitrallid, Naksitrallid II), (d. 2013).

May
 May 13: Arthur Lipsett, Canadian film director and animator (Very Nice, Very Nice, 21-87, A Trip Down Memory Lane), (d. 1986).
 May 17: Mark Hall, English animator and film producer (Cosgrove Hall Films, Danger Mouse), (d. 2011).
 May 23: Charles Kimbrough, American actor (voice of Victor in The Hunchback of Notre Dame and The Hunchback of Notre Dame II, Mort Chalk in Recess: School's Out, Rainbow Face #1 in The Land Before Time VII: The Stone of Cold Fire, Dr. Bob in the Mighty Max episode "Scorpio Rising", Sandy Dreckman in the Pinky and the Brain episode "You'll Never Eat Food Pellets in This Town Again!", Jim Dial in the Family Guy episode "A Picture is Worth $1,000 Bucks", Stage Gordon in the Batman Beyond episode "Out of the Past", Pat Jensen in The Zeta Project episode "On the Wire", narrator in The Angry Beavers episode "Canucks Amuck", additional voices in Whisper of the Heart), (d. 2023).
 May 27: Louis Gossett Jr., American actor (voice of Zahn in Delgo, Lucius Fox in The Batman, Commander Clash in Captain Planet and the Planeteers, Sergeant Angryman in the Family Guy episode "Saving Private Brian").

June
 June 1: Gerald Scarfe, English cartoonist and illustrator (Pink Floyd – The Wall, Hercules).
 June 6: Levi Stubbs, American baritone singer (voice of Mother Brain in Captain N: The Game Master), (d. 2008).
 June 19: Takeshi Aono, Japanese actor (voice of Shiro Sanada in Space Battleship Yamato, Kami and Piccolo in the Dragon Ball franchise, Rihaku in Fist of the North Star, Japanese dub voice of Joker in the DC Animated Universe, King Harold in the Shrek franchise, Uncle Max in The Lion King 1½, and Sir Topham Hatt in Thomas & Friends), (d. 2012).
 June 20: Derek Lamb, English animator and film producer (Special Delivery, Mystery!, Sports Cartoons, Sesame Street, played himself in Ryan), (d. 2005).
 June 22: John Korty, American film director and animator (Sesame Street, Twice Upon a Time, Vegetable Soup), (d. 2022).

July
 July 24: Ruth Buzzi, American actress and comedian (voice of Granny Goodwitch in Linus the Lionhearted, voice of Gladys in Baggy Pants and the Nitwits, Mama Bear in The Berenstain Bears, Nose Marie in Pound Puppies, Felonia Funk in Rockin' with Judy Jetson, Delilah in Sheep in the Big City, Nandy in Cro, singing voice of Frou-Frou in The Aristocats).

August
 August 11: Mitsutoshi Furuya, Japanese manga artist (Dame Oyaji), (d. 2021).
 August 19: Robert Towers, American actor (voice of Cool Kitty in Kidd Video, Snoopy in You're a Good Man, Charlie Brown, Walter Peck in The Real Ghostbusters episode "Big Trouble with Little Slimer").

September
 September 14: Walter Koenig, American actor (voice of Mr. Savic in Stretch Armstrong and the Flex Fighters, Vladimir Pavel Maximov in The Real Ghostbusters episode "Russian About", himself in the Futurama episode "Where No Fan Has Gone Before") and screenwriter (wrote the Star Trek: The Animated Series episode "The Infinite Vulcan").
 September 18: Roman Arámbula, Mexican comics artist, animator and lay-out artist (Hanna-Barbera, Pinky and the Brain), (d. 2020).
 September 24: Jim Henson, American puppeteer and animator (Muppet Babies), (d. 1990).

October
 October 9: Brian Blessed, English actor (voice of El Supremo in Freddie as F.R.O.7, Boss Nass in Star Wars Episode I: The Phantom Menace, Clayton in Tarzan, the Pirate King in The Pirates! In an Adventure with Scientists!, Santa Claus in The Amazing World of Gumball and Danger Mouse, Grampy Rabbit in Peppa Pig, General Caous in Asterix and the Big Fight, Charlemagne in Wizards: Tales of Arcadia and Wizards: Rise of the Titans, Eduardo Enormomonster in Henry Hugglemonster, Judge Jawbreaker in Legends of Oz: Dorothy's Return, Prince Vultan in the Family Guy episode "Road to Germany").
 October 25: Masako Nozawa, Japanese actress (voice of Goku in the Dragon Ball franchise).
 October 26: Reiko Okuyama, Japanese animator (Nippon Animation), (d. 2007).

November
 November 3: Takao Saitō, Japanese manga artist (Golgo 13), (d. 2021).
 November 19: Dick Cavett, American television personality, comedian and former talk show host (voiced himself in The Simpsons episode "Homie the Clown").

December
 December 5: John Erwin, American actor (voice of the title character in He-Man and the Masters of the Universe).
 December 6: David Ossman, American comedian and actor (voice of Professor Peelie in The Tick, Cornelius in A Bug's Life, Scabies in Osmosis Jones).
 December 8: David Carradine, American actor (voice of Mandrax in Captain Simian & the Space Monkeys, Chief Wulisso in An American Tail: The Treasure of Manhattan Island, Nava in Balto II: Wolf Quest, Mr. Snerz in Hair High, Clockwork in Danny Phantom, Lo Pei in the Jackie Chan Adventures episode "The Warrior Incarnate", Junichiro Hill in the King of the Hill episode "Returning Japanese"), (d. 2009).
 December 22: Hector Elizondo, American actor (voice of Ioz in The Pirates of Dark Water, Malcho in Aladdin, Lt. Kragger in Justice League and Justice League Unlimited, Bane in Batman: Mystery of the Batwoman, Wan Shi Tong in Avatar: The Last Airbender and The Legend of Korra, Jim Gordon in The Lego Batman Movie, Grandpa Beagle in Mickey Mouse Mixed-Up Adventures, Fiero in Elena of Avalor, Carlos Sanchez in The Book of Life, Dooka in Green Eggs and Ham, Captain Colossus in the Jake and the Never Land Pirates episode "The Legion of Pirate Villains!", King Vicuna in the Go, Diego, Go! episode "Diego Rescues Prince Vicuna", Wishing Wizzle in the Dora the Explorer episode "Dora's Big Birthday Adventure").

Specific date unknown
 Glenn Vilppu, American painter, art instructor, animator (Walt Disney Animation Studios, Marvel Productions) and storyboard artist (Peter Pan & the Pirates, Tiny Toon Adventures).

References

External links 
Animated works of the year, listed in the IMDb